Jiřice u Miroslavi is a municipality and village in Znojmo District in the South Moravian Region of the Czech Republic. It has about 500 inhabitants.

Notable people
Ernest Maria Müller (1822–1888), bishop

References

Villages in Znojmo District